Blood of the Samurai is a 2001 American action film directed by Aaron Yamasato.  It stars Bryan Yamasaki and Michael Ng as two friends who, after discovering a pair of ancient katanas, become possessed by the swords.  A mysterious man, played by Shawn Forsythe, hunts them down to recover the katanas.  It premiered at the Hawaii International Film Festival in November 2001.

Plot

Trent and Rob have ordinary lives, but when they find a bundle of stolen ancient samurai swords, they are plunged into a world of darkness and chaos. Suddenly Trent knows how to deftly wield a katana, Rob is writing death threats in Japanese, and a villain named The Hunter, who is armed with two crossbows, is stalking their now-extraordinary lives. It’s no secret: The city is a dangerous place to live in. There are gang murders, skinheads, and drunken stragglers with whom to contend, and the desensitivity of the city’s denizens is rising. Still, best friends Rob and Trent find a comfortable degree of normalcy in their everyday lives. One night, however, the two return home and find that someone has stashed a mysterious parcel in the back of Trent's car. When they find out the parcel contains samurai swords, the first thing they do is get into a play fight. But in the middle of the night, Trent wakes up to find that Rob does not want to just play anymore; he wants a real 1400-Edo-style brawl. After Rob disappears, a dark villain known as The Hunter appears in his wake, asking for the swords. When he does not get what he wants, he takes Trent's girlfriend Brooke as collateral. In one heated moment Trent realizes that life will never be the same. Armed with a righteous vengeance and an adeptness with the newfound katana that contains a story of its own, Trent stalks the night in search of Rob and Brooke.

Cast 
 Bryan Yamasaki as Trent
 Michael Ng as Rob
 Shawn Forsythe as the Hunter
 Colleen Fujioka as Brooke
 Stephanie Sanchez as Roxy
 Rick Lum as Reverend

Production 
Yamasato was inspired by the Japanese tokusatsu franchise Kikaider and subconsciously included homage to it that he only recognized later after others had pointed it out.  Screaming Mad George did special effects for the film.

Release 
Blood of the Samurai premiered at the Hawaii International Film Festival on November 3, 2001.  Cinema Epoch released it on DVD in the US on June 4, 2013.

Reception 
Reviewing a rough cut of the film, Gary C. W. Chun of the Honolulu Star-Bulletin wrote that although the film start off well, the acting and writing are sub-par.  Chun later labeled his review as an attempt to humorously critique the film.  Albert Lanier of Ain't It Cool News called it "a cheesy, low budgeted, over-the-top b-movie that works like a charm".  Stina Chyn of Film Threat rated it 4/5 stars and wrote that the film's action sequences make up for the occasional technical errors.  Jeremy Blitz of DVD Talk rated it 2/5 stars and wrote, "While there are elements that are impressive in isolation, the whole doesn't work."

It received the Hawaii Film & Videomaker Award at the HIFF and a Telly Award.

Television series 
A six-episode TV series for Oc 16 aired in October 2003.

References

External links
 

2001 films
2001 action films
American action films
Samurai films
2000s English-language films
2000s American films
2000s Japanese films